Tungua is an island in Lulunga district, in the Ha'apai islands of Tonga. The island had a population of 187 in 2016.

References

Islands of Tonga
Haʻapai